Josephus Carel Franciscus (Jef) Last (2 May 1898 in The Hague – 15 February 1972 in Laren) was a Dutch poet, writer, translator and cosmopolitan.

Jef Last was a writer and socially compassionate man. He had a Catholic background. However, he was very young member of the SDAP and the "AJC". With these principles, he could not practice as an assistant manager of the Enka in Ede, and eventually he resigned.

He left the revisionist social democracy to become a member of Henk Sneevliet's Revolutionary Socialist Party. With his revolutionary friend André Gide, he traveled in the summer of 1936 to the Soviet Union. The pair was well received, but saw through the organized tribute and returned to the west disillusioned. Much later Last wrote a book about his friendship with Gide.

He last fought in the Spanish Civil War in the International Brigades, which was on the side of the Spanish Republic. As a result, he lost his Dutch citizenship because of military service for a foreign power. Shortly after the Second World War, his citizenship was returned.

From 1950 to 1953, he lived in Indonesia, particularly in Singaraja (Bali), where he worked as a teacher at a secondary school. He was friends with president Sukarno and Mohammad Hatta.

Family
He was married to Ida ter Haar (1893-1982) from 1923, whom he divorced and later remarried. They had three daughters. Jef was bisexual. He was co-founder of the homosexual emancipation Shakespeare Club, the forerunner of the COC.

The last years of his life were spent in the Rosa Spier Huis in Laren. After his death, his body was made available to science.

Work 
1926 – Bakboordslichten (poetry)
1930 – Branding
1930 – Kameraden! (poetry)
1930 – Marianne
1932 – Liefde in de portieken
1932 – Verleden tijd (poetry)
1933 – Onder de koperen ploert
1933 – Partij remise
1933 – Twee werelden (poetry)
1933 – De vlucht van den opstandeling
1934 – Zuiderzee
1935 – Een huis zonder vensters
1935 – Voor de mast
1936 – Brieven uit Spanje
1936 – De bevrijde Eros. Een ketter in moorenland en andere gedichten (poetry)
1936 – Een flirt met den duivel
1937 – Bloedkoraal (poetry)
1937 – In de loopgraven voor Madrid
1937 – De Spaansche tragedie (The Spanish tragedy/Spanish Front. Writers on the Civil War)
1938 – De laatste waarheid
1939 – Kruisgang der jeugd; with Harry Wilde
1939 – De vliegende Hollander
1940 – Kinderen van de middernachtzon
1940 – Onvoldoende voor de liefde
1941 – Van een jongen die een man werd part I and II (youth work in 1919, at the time not published)
1941 – Elfstedentocht
1942 – Leeghwater maalt de meren leeg
1944 – Tau Kho Tau (poetry)
1945 – Een socialistische renaissance
1945 – Het eerste schip op de Newa (The first ship up the Neva)
1946 – Oog in oog (poetry)
1947 – Vingers van de linkerhand
1949 – In de zevende hemel
1950 – Schuim op de kust
1951 – De rode en de witte lotus
1953 – Inleiding tot het denken van Confucius  
1955 – Bali in de kentering
1956 – Zo zag ik Indonesië
1957 – Een lotje uit de loterij
1958 – I Bontot en I Koese. De avonturen van twee Balische jongens; with Udeyana Pandji Tisna (The John Day Company)
1959 – Lu Hsün. Dichter und Idol
1960 – Japan in kimono en overall
1960 – Tegen de draad (poetry)
1960 – Vloog een bloesem terug naar haar tak
1962 – De Spaanse tragedie
1962 – Golven der Gele Rivier
1962 – De jeugd van Judas (The boyhood of Judas; in: The fifth Acolyte Reader, Meppel 1991)
1965 – China, land van de eeuwige omwenteling
1966 – De tweede dageraad van Japan
1966 – Mijn vriend André Gide
1967 – Rinus van der Lubbe, doodstraf voor een provo (edited reissue of Kruisgang der jeugd)
1968 – Strijd, handel en zeeroverij. De Hollandse tijd op Formosa
1970 – Vuurwerk achter de Chinese muur
1972 – Tjoebek in het tijgerbos (children's book)
1973 – De zeven Caramboles; under pseudonym Co Mantjens, second edition with subtitel: De postume pornoroman van Jef Last

References

External links 
  Jef Last.nl

1898 births
1972 deaths
Writers from The Hague
Dutch male poets
Dutch LGBT rights activists
Bisexual men
Bisexual poets
Writers about the Soviet Union
Dutch LGBT poets
Dutch bisexual people
International Brigades personnel
20th-century Dutch poets
20th-century Dutch male writers
20th-century Dutch LGBT people